John Appleyard (born 20 July 1938) is an English former List A cricketer. Born at Hitchin, he was a left-arm slow bowler who played for Hertfordshire. He made his first cricketing appearance in 1957, at the age of 19, playing for Essex's Second XI, taking two wickets in the first innings in which he bowled. Appleyard appeared occasionally in the Minor Counties Championship between 1960 and 1965 for Buckinghamshire. He made his List A debut in the Gillette Cup competition of 1966, and also appeared in the 1969, 1971 and 1974 competitions.

References

1938 births
Living people
English cricketers
Hertfordshire cricketers
Buckinghamshire cricketers
Sportspeople from Hitchin